Charles Carl Crabbe (November 1, 1878 – June 2, 1969) was a lawyer from the U.S. state of Ohio who was a legislator in the Ohio House of Representatives and served as Ohio Attorney General 1923-1927.

Biography

Charles C. Crabbe was born on a farm in Madison County, Ohio in 1878, and educated in country schools. He taught school and studied law for seven years, and completed his law studies at Ohio Northern University College of Law in Ada, Ohio.

Crabbe was admitted to the bar in 1904, and practiced in Madison County. He served three terms as Madison County Prosecuting Attorney. He was elected to the Ohio House of Representatives in 1918 as a Republican. He later was elected to two terms as Ohio Attorney General.

Crabbe married Ida M. Roth on September 22, 1904 at London, Ohio. They had a son named John Roth Crabbe. Charles Crabbe died at Columbus, Ohio, June 2, 1969.

References

Ohio Attorneys General
Republican Party members of the Ohio House of Representatives
People from Madison County, Ohio
1878 births
1969 deaths
County district attorneys in Ohio
Claude W. Pettit College of Law alumni